Raúl Castro Peñaloza (born 19 August 1989), nicknamed as "Chacha" and "El Comandante", is a Bolivian footballer who plays as a defensive midfielder for Liga de Fútbol Profesional Boliviano club Wilstermann.

References

External links
 

1989 births
Living people
Bolivian footballers
Footballers from La Paz
The Strongest players
Bolivia international footballers
Association football midfielders
2019 Copa América players
Universitario de Sucre footballers
C.D. Jorge Wilstermann players
Bolivian Primera División players